Hamburg, also known as Hamburgh or Hamburg Station, is an unincorporated community in Perry County, Alabama, United States. A post office operated under the name Hamburg from 1833 to 1941.

Demographics

Hamburg appeared on the 1850 U.S. Census as an incorporated town. It had a population of 92. Of those 92, it had 46 black and 46 white residents. Forty five of the forty six black residents were slaves and 1 was free. This was the only time Hamburg appeared on the census rolls. Although it was mentioned on the 1870 census, its population was not separately returned from its precinct.

Notable person
 Mary Ward Brown, novelist

References

Unincorporated communities in Perry County, Alabama
Unincorporated communities in Alabama